The 1936–37 Sheffield Shield season was the 41st season of the Sheffield Shield, the domestic first-class cricket competition of Australia. Victoria won the championship.

Table

Statistics

Most Runs
Keith Rigg 593

Most Wickets
Chuck Fleetwood-Smith 34

References

Sheffield Shield
Sheffield Shield
Sheffield Shield seasons